The black-capped sparrow (Arremon abeillei) is a species of bird in the family Passerellidae.

It is found in Ecuador and Peru where its natural habitats are subtropical or tropical dry forest and subtropical or tropical moist lowland forest.

References

black-capped sparrow
Birds of the Tumbes-Chocó-Magdalena
Birds of Ecuador
Birds of Peru
black-capped sparrow
Taxonomy articles created by Polbot